The Hanekleiv tunnel is a road tunnel in Vestfold og Telemark, Norway, one of seven along the European route E18 between Sande and Holmestrand. The tunnel became the centre of controversy on 25 December 2006 when part of the roof collapsed, and investigations revealed that several tunnels on the E18 through Vestfold were insufficiently secured. The tunnel was fully reopened on August 30, 2007.

Technical details
The tunnel is 1,765 metres long and has two tubes, one for each direction of travel and each accommodating two lanes of highway. The tunnels were opened for traffic on 30 October 2001. The rock which the tunnel is built through is frequently unstable. To compensate for this, the tunnel roof and walls were reinforced at places with bolts and concrete injections, however the tunnel was not equipped with concrete walls throughout the length of the tunnel.

The E18 tunnels in Vestfold had about 17,000 vehicles pass through them each day.

December 25, 2006 incident
Late on Christmas Day, about 200 cubic metres of rock fell from the ceiling of the southbound tunnel, onto the highway below. No cars were in the tunnel at the time, and there were no injuries. Debris continued to fall in the tunnel for up to three hours after the initial collapse. The debris covered a 25 meter long stretch of road, and at places the pile was almost as high as the tunnel.

The police department of Southern Buskerud was tasked with investigating the avalanche. Neighbors close to the tunnel reported having noticed slight tremors and rumbles. Worries about the tunnel's safety had surfaced already during construction in 1997, when construction on the tunnel was halted so that additional security measures could be implemented.

May 28, 2007 incident
During repair work on 28 May 2007, two workers who were repairing and securing the tunnel sustained light injuries in a second incident. An unknown amount of concrete from the original securing of the tunnel fell over the workers. Statens Vegvesen rejects that this was a new collapse of the tunnel, declaring the episode to be a work accident.

Fallout
The investigation uncovered serious shortcomings in the security of tunnels throughout Vestfold, not only the Hanekleiv Tunnel. Several other tunnels near the Hanekleiv tunnel were deemed to be safety risks, and had to be closed for further investigations and securing. The Progress Party demanded that the director of the Norwegian Directorate of Public Roads, Olav Søfteland, resign as a result.

The cost of adequate reinforcement of the Vestfold E18 tunnels was estimated to be 200 million Norwegian kroner, or some 33.2 million US dollars.

The closure of the E18 highway for tunnel repairs during the summer of 2007 lead to major traffic jams. Proposals to mitigate the road troubles included more trains and cutting the fares by 50% on the Vestfoldbanen railway.

References

Road tunnels in Vestfold og Telemark
European route E18 in Norway
2001 establishments in Norway
Tunnels completed in 2001